Events from the year 1465 in France

Incumbents
 Monarch – Louis XI

Events
 16 July - Louis XI fights the inconclusive Battle of Montlhéry during the War of the Public Weal
 5 October - Louis XI signs the Treaty of Conflans granting concessions to his opponents
 The League of the Public Weal was established

Deaths
 5 January - Charles, Duke of Orléans, soldier and poet (born 1394)

References

1460s in France